James Comer may refer to:

 James Comer (politician) (born 1972), United States Representative from Kentucky
 James P. Comer (born 1934), American child psychologist

See also
 James Comey, director of the Federal Bureau of Investigation